I Marinella se tragoudia tis Vembo (Greek: Η Μαρινέλλα σε τραγούδια της Βέμπο) is the name of a studio album by popular Greek singer Marinella. It was released on 3 March 1980 by PolyGram Records in Greece and includes 12 studio recordings by Marinella in songs of the "Songstress of Victory", the popular Greek singer Sofia Vembo. This album was issued in mono and stereo. The stereo version of this album was released on CD in 1994 by PolyGram.

Track listing 
Side One.
 "Svise to fos" (Σβήσε το φως; Switch off the light) – (Leo Rapitis - Mimis Traiforos) – 3:25
 "O anthropos mou" (Ο άνθρωπος μου; My man) – (Menelaos Theofanidis - Mimis Traiforos) – 3:28
 "Na me pernane ta synnefa" (Να με παίρνανε τα σύννεφα; If the clouds could take me) – (Leo Rapitis - Mimis Traiforos) – 3:11
 "Tha kathomouna plai sou" (Θα καθόμουνα πλάι σου; I would sit near you) – (Michalis Souyioul - Giorgos Giannakopoulos - Alekos Sakellarios) – 2:50
 "Harami" (Χαράμι; In vain) – (Michalis Souyioul - Mimis Traiforos) – 3:02
 "Erini" (Ερήνη; Irene) – (Kostas Giannidis - Mimis Traiforos) – 3:22
 A live version of this song appears on Mia Vradia Me Tin Marinella.
Side Two.
 "I tampakera" (Η ταμπακέρα; The cigarette case) – (Joseph Richiadis - Mimis Traiforos - Giorgos Giannakopoulos) – 3:31
 "S' agapo ke m' aresi i zoi" (Σ' αγαπώ και μ' αρέσει η ζωή; I love you and I like life) - (Menelaos Theofanidis - Mimis Traiforos) – 2:50
 "Gia 'sena" (Για 'σένα; For you) – (Vaggelis Lykiardopoulos - Mimis Traiforos) – 3:11
 "Pare pia to dromo sou" (Πάρε πια το δρόμο σου Go your way now) – (Akis Smyrneos - Mimis Traiforos) – 3:16
 "Omonia Place" (Ομόνοια Place; Omonoia Square) – (Menelaos Theofanidis - Giorgos Asimakopoulos – Panagiotis Papadoukas) – 3:41
 "Kapios, kapou, kapote" (Κάποιος, κάπου, κάποτε; Someone, somewhere, sometime) – (Menelaos Theofanidis - Giorgos Giannakopoulos - Mimis Traiforos) – 2:47

Personnel 
 Marinella - vocals
 Kostas Klavvas - adaption, arranger, conductor
 Philippos Papatheodorou - producer
 Yiannis Smyrneos - recording engineer
 Alinta Mavrogeni - photographer

References

1980 albums
Greek-language albums
Marinella albums
Universal Music Greece albums